A pet-raising simulation (sometimes called artificial pets) is a video game that focuses on the care, raising, breeding or exhibition of simulated animals. These games are software implementations of digital pets. Such games are described as a sub-class of life simulation game. The concept originated from role-playing video games, with the Megami Tensei series and Dragon Quest V being two early examples.

Handheld electronic game 

 Digital Monster (Digimon)
 Dragonvale
 Giga Pet
 Pokémon Pikachu
 Tamagotchi
 Pingus’s Pethouse

Console or handheld 

 101 Shark Pets
 Animal Crossing (Animal Island minigame)
 Azure Dreams
 Danganronpa 2 (minigame)
 Digimon World
 Digimon World: Next Order
 Dog's Life
 Dragon Quest V
 Dragon Quest Monsters
 EyePet
 Final Fantasy VIII
 Final Fantasy XIII-2
 Hey You, Pikachu!
 Jade Cocoon
 Kinectimals
 Lufia II: Rise of the Sinistrals
 Megami Tensei
 Monster Rancher
 Neko Atsume
 Ni no Kuni
 Nintendogs
 Pokémon
 Pokémon Breeder Mini
 Purr Pals
 Robotrek
 Seaman
 SimAnimals
 Sonic Adventure and Sonic Adventure 2 (Chao raising minigame)
 Sonic Advance, Sonic Advance 2, and Sonic Pinball Party (Chao raising minigame on the Tiny Chao Garden)
 Viva Piñata
 Yo-Kai Watch
 Puppy Luv
 Hamsterz Life
 Wobbledogs

Social network embedded 

 Pet Society
 PetVille

Smart phone/mobile devices 

 My Talking Angela
 My Talking Tom
 Pocket Frogs
 Pou

PC or computer games 
 Adopt Me!
 Animal Jam
 Busou Shinki Battle Rondo
 Creatures
 Fin Fin on Teo the Magic Planet
 Fish Tycoon
 GoPets
 Insaniquarium
 MOPy fish
 PF Magic's Petz Series
 Petz
 The Sims 2: Pets
 The Sims 3: Pets
 The Sims 4: Cats & Dogs
 The Sims: Unleashed
 Neopets
 Zoo Tycoon 2
 Puppy Luv
 Wobbledogs

Browser-based games

See also 

 Digital pets
 Virtual pet site

References